Cosmic Sin is a 2021 American science fiction action film directed by Edward Drake. The film stars Bruce Willis, Frank Grillo, Brandon Thomas Lee, Corey Large, Perrey Reeves, C.J. Perry, Lochlyn Munro, and Costas Mandylor.

Cosmic Sin was released in the United States on March 12, 2021, by Saban Films. The film was panned by critics and at the 42nd Golden Raspberry Awards won the award for "Worst Performance by Bruce Willis in a 2021 Movie"; however, the award was rescinded following Willis's diagnosis of aphasia.

Plot

In the year 2031, the first colony of Mars is founded. By 2042, the Alliance was formed and quantum propulsion technology allows humanity to travel beyond the solar system. Unfortunately, the Mars colony fails in 2281 and the Alliance controls the three colonies: Earth, Zafdie, and Ellora. 
 
Zafdie attempts to secede from the alliance in 2519. In this war James Ford drops a Q(uantum)-Bomb on the rebel colony, killing 70 million people. After committing this atrocity, he is dishonorably discharged from the Alliance military; his wife, Dr. Lea Goss, leaves him; and he is subsequently known as "The Blood General".

In space, the Sigea is an invasive alien species that invades and conquers other worlds. They can parasitically infect others by forcing them to ingest a black fluid that puts them under the control of the Sigea's hive mind.

In the year 2524, the Vander Mining Corp is stationed on planet 4217LYA (Heracles System) when Captain Juda Sayle reports an alien encounter to the Alliance. On Earth, General Eron Ryle is notified and wants Dr. Goss and Ford in on the situation.

At a local bar, Dash meets with Ford for a job when civilians pick a fight with him, but Commander Marcus Bleck appears and intervenes. Bleck requests his presence but Ford refuses, relenting only when Bleck mentions that a successful mission will earn Ford's reinstatement. At the McMillian Airfield, Dash tags along with Ford to a meeting with Dr. Goss and Ryle about what happened in the Heracles System. Survivors of the Vander mining operation are sent to the airfield for debriefing, but Goss raises concerns. The survivors are under Sigea control and start killing security. The soldiers win, but at the cost of 53 lives.

The incident is considered an attack on humanity and the Alliance is to strike back in the form of Operation: Cosmic Sin. Ford, Ryle, Goss, Braxton, Bleck, Dash, and Ardene travel to Ellora via Quantum Jump Gate to stop the Sigea; however while entering Ellora, Ryle's suit gets damaged and he is presumed dead when he doesn't rendezvous with the team. Ford and Goss have also been separated from the group during entry, and Bleck is mortally wounded shortly after making it to the surface. As the team struggles to take out their attackers, Elloran survivors aid them, including Sol Cantos.

After verifying they're free of Sigea influence, the survivors agree to guide them to the orbital cannon and treat Bleck's injuries. At the Alliance outpost, the surviving team learns about how the Sigea infect and control people. Ford makes it to the outpost to find Bleck, whom he mercy kills. In a meeting with the surviving soldiers, a plan is formed to try and collapse the gateway between Ellora and the Sigea galaxy with a Q-Bomb the team brought with them.

In space, Ryle is able to reach out to Ardene through the coms. Stranded, he volunteers to help detonate the gateway to seal off the Sigea, who know the survivors are holding up at the orbital cannon and converge on the outpost; Goss reveals herself to be possessed by the Sigea, and gives them a chance to surrender, which they refuse. The group prepares to make their last stand, defending the outpost as long as possible for Ardene to fire the cannon.

While the rest of the group holds off the alien attackers, Ford latches on to a Sigea ship and follows Goss to the gateway, where she says that there was never going to be peace between humans and the Sigea. Ford is repelled back to Ellora while Goss drifts through the gate. Unable to detonate his suit's remaining fuel manually, Ryle has Ardene and Braxton fire the cannon at him after a final goodbye to his nephew. The resulting chain reaction destroys the gateway as the Q-bomb crosses over into Sigea space and opens a black hole. The gate closes behind the black hole, sealing and wiping out the Segia attack fleet and their entire solar system.

A week later, Ford heads back to the bar for a drink along with the survivors of Ellora. Dash, Ardene, Braxton, and Sol Cantos survived the battle and the Alliance celebrates their victory with the remaining Sigea having unconditionally surrendered following the destruction of their fleet and their home star system. Ford takes a shot, as reminisces of Goss, and leaves the bar.

Cast
 Bruce Willis as James Ford
 Frank Grillo as Gen. Eron Ryle
 Brandon Thomas Lee as Braxton Ryle
 Corey Large as Dash
 Perrey Reeves as Dr. Lea Goss
 C.J. Perry as Sol Cantos
 Lochlyn Munro as Alex Locke
 Costas Mandylor as Marcus Bleck
 Adelaide Kane as Corporal Fiona Ardene
 Eva De Dominici as Juda Sayle
 Trevor Gretzky as Felix Zand
 Johnny Messner as Coco (uncredited cameo)
 Mark Rhynard as Alliance Soldier #3

Production
Principal photography wrapped up in March 2020.

Release
The film was released in theaters, video-on-demand and digital platforms on March 12, 2021. Paramount Home Entertainment released the film on DVD and Blu-ray on May 18, 2021.

Box office
As of August 27, 2022, Cosmic Sin grossed $349,757 in Ukraine, the United Arab Emirates, Russia, Australia, South Korea, and New Zealand.

Reception
The film has a 6% rating on Rotten Tomatoes, based on 35 reviews with an average rating of 2.80/10. The website's critics consensus reads: "Let he who is without Cosmic Sin cast the first stone—and possibly use it to rouse Bruce Willis from the slumber he seems to be in throughout this dreadful sci-fi blunder." On Metacritic, the film has a weighted average score of 9 out of 100, based on 4 critics, indicating "overwhelming dislike".

Christy Lemire of RogerEbert.com gave the film a zero-star negative review and wrote, "To suggest that Bruce Willis is phoning in his performance in Cosmic Sin would be an insult to telephone communication, which can be an effective means of conveying important information and genuine emotion." Lemire called the film "baffling and boring" and commented: "Worst of all, Cosmic Sin isn’t even a bad B-movie in an interesting way".

Noel Murray of the Los Angeles Times wrote that while the film did have some "genuinely impressive special effects sequences" and an ambitious screenplay, it was "pretty tedious" and clichéd. The reviewer commented that while Willis only had minimal screen time in most of his recent pictures, the "good news" in Cosmic Sin was that roughly half of the action directly involved him: however, "The bad news is that he’s somehow more lackluster than usual — something that would seem to be impossible given his recent run." Murray also noted that the films "perks up" when Frank Grillo appears on screen, but that Grillo's screen time was too limited, making him "the Bruce Willis of this movie — offering little more than another recognizable face to put on the poster."

Accolades
Bruce Willis was nominated for his performance in this movie, along with all his other 2021 performances, in the category "Worst Performance by Bruce Willis in a 2021 Movie" at the Golden Raspberry Awards. The category was later rescinded after he announced his retirement from acting due to aphasia.

References

External links
 

Alien invasions in films
American science fiction action films
American space adventure films
Saban Films films
2021 science fiction action films
Films about extraterrestrial life
Films directed by Edward John Drake
2020s English-language films
2021 independent films
2020s American films